Clifford Joseph (born 26 September 1978) is a footballer who played for two national football teams.

International career
Joseph made his international debut playing for Dominica in 2000, during the 2002 FIFA World Cup qualification. This remained his only cap for Dominica. He then later went on to make eight appearances for Montserrat between 2004 and 2011.

Style of play
He's known as a utility player because Clifford could play in any position on the pitch, including in goal which he once did for Montserrat in a World Cup Qualifier.

References

1978 births
Living people
Montserratian footballers
Montserrat international footballers
Place of birth missing (living people)
Ideal SC players
Association football utility players